Ostracion solorensis is a species of boxfish native to the western Pacific Ocean. Its common name is reticulate boxfish. It grows to 12 centimeters in length. It is sometimes kept as an aquarium fish.

References

External links
 

Ostraciidae
Fish described in 1853